The death of Ibrahim Ali (1978 – February 21, 1995) took place in Marseille, France, in 1995. Then aged 17, Ibrahim Ali, a French citizen of Comorian origins, was shot and killed by Robert Lagier on 21st of February 1995.

The shooting 
On the night of February 21, 1995, Robert Lagier and his two friends Mario d'ambrosio and Pierre Giglio, supporters of the far-right Front National headed to the immigrant neighbourhoods of north Marseille to hang posters for their party's presidential candidate, Jean-Marie Le Pen. Under a smiling image of Mr Le Pen, the poster said: "With Le Pen, Three million Immigrants Sent Home". At a traffic intersection, the men saw ten Afro-French youths running past them to get to a bus stop. They had just finished their rap rehearsal and carried instruments and sound equipment, and were running to avoid missing the last bus home. Robert Lagier drew his .22 pistol from an ankle holster. 17-year old Ibrahim Ali took a single bullet in the back, from which it struck his heart. He collapsed to the ground and quickly died of blood loss. Marco d'Ambrosio also drew his pistol and fired a few shots at the retreating Afro-French, though he didn't hit anyone.

Aftermath 
After the incident, Laiger falsely claimed the youths had thrown stones at his car, and he was defending himself. However, police found no dents or cracks on the windshield and no rocks in the intersection around where his car was parked. The National Front backed Laiger completely, forming the "DGL Association" (after their initials) to "help our prisoners". Bruno Megret, considered the successor to Le Pen within the NF, falsely claimed that the men had been "violently attacked by about 15 Comorians". At the trial, Megret refused to apologize to the victim's family on the ground that "there is no collective responsibility in French law", but he praised the FN members as "average Frenchmen" who "deserve respect and dedicate themselves to others, to love of their country and defence of their people."

Jean-Marie Le Pen initially responded to the murder, saying "at least this unfortunate incident has brought to everyone's attention the presence in Marseille of 50,000 Comorians. What are they doing here?" However, following another murder of immigrants by members of the National Front, Le Pen stated, "The people who did this are criminals and should be arrested by the police." Bruno Megret declared, "the blame is on massive and uncontrolled immigration... if our billstickers hadn't been armed, they would have probably been dead."

Robert Lagier was ultimately convicted and sentenced to 15 years in prison for murder. His friend d'Ambrosio was convicted of attempted murder and convicted to 10 years in prison. Pierre Giglio, the third FN man, received a two-year sentence for illegally carrying a gun in his car.

Associations and elected officials from the city of Marseille have tried since the events, without success, to create a day in memory of Ibrahim on each 21st of February. Several other actions have been proposed in order to denounce racism but none have been implemented until 2015, when a memorial plate was installed where the incident took place. In February 2021, the city council decided to rename the Avenue des Aygalades to Avenue Ibrahim-Ali.

References 

Anti-Muslim violence in Europe
1995 deaths
Comorian people murdered abroad
Crime in Provence-Alpes-Cote d'Azur
Deaths by firearm in France
French murder victims
Comorian murder victims
Marseille
Murder in France
Murdered French children
National Rally (France)
People murdered in France
Ali Ibrahim
1995 murders in France